Jean Leonardus Gerardus (Jan) Dietz (born 20 June 1945) is a Dutch Information systems researcher, Emeritus Professor of Information Systems Design, and part-time Professor of Enterprise Engineering at the Delft University of Technology, known for the development of the Design & Engineering Methodology for Organizations. and his work on enterprise ontology.

Biography 
Born in Brunssum, Dietz studied at the Eindhoven University of Technology, where in 1970 he obtained his MA in Electrical Engineering, and later in 1987 his PhD with the thesis entitled "Modelleren en specificeren van informatiesystemen" (Specification and modeling of information systems) under supervision of Kees van Hee en Theo Bemelmans.

Dietz has been practitioner in the field of automation and information systems from 1970 to 1980. Here he developed one of the first relational model based production control systems at Philips Factories, a state of the art computer accounting system at Eindhoven University of Technology, and a terminal-based, interactive theatre reservation system. In 1980 he returned to academia. After graduation in 1987 he was appointed Professor of Management Information Systems at the University of Maastricht at the Faculty of Economics and Business Administration, where he started the development of the DEMO theory and methodology. From September 1994 to Oct 2009 he was Professor of Information Systems Design at Delft University of Technology. Since then he is part-time Professor of Enterprise Engineering at the Instituto Superior Técnico (IST - Technical University of Lisbon). Since 2010 he is part-time Professor of Enterprise Engineering at Delft TopTech at the Delft University of Technology. Since 2016 is Mr. Dietz Visiting Professor at Czech Technical University in Prague's Faculty of Informatics, Center for Conceptual Modelling and Implementations (CCMi).

Dietz has been chairman of the Dutch national professional association of informaticians, has been editorial board member of several journals, and has been in the program committee of - and has chaired - numerous conferences. He has been the Dutch national representative in IFIP TC8 on Information Systems for many years and is member of IFIP WG8.1 on design and Evaluation of Information Systems.

Work 
Dietz' main research interests is in modeling, design and redesigning and engineering and reengineering of organizations, and in the development of ICT-applications to support them. In the new millennium Dietz has focussed on the emerging field of Enterprise engineering, which emerged in between information systems engineering and the organizational sciences.

In 2006 he published a book on Enterprise Ontology, and is continuing working on Enterprise Architecture. To promote these ideas he initiated an international network under the name "Cooperation & Interoperability - Architecture & Ontology" (CIAO).

Design & Engineering Methodology for Organizations 
Inspired on the Language Action Perspective in the 1980s Dietz has been developing a methodology for transaction modelling, and analysing and representing business processes called Design & Engineering Methodology for Organizations (DEMO). The Language Action Perspective itself is largely based on the speech act theory developed by John Searle. It was introduced in the field of information systems by the computer scientists Fernando Flores and J.J. Ludlow early 1980s has "proven to be a new basic paradigm for Information Systems Design. In contrast to traditional views of "data flow", the language/action perspective emphasizes what people do while communicating, how they create a common reality by means of language, and how communication brings about a coordination of their activities".

In DEMO the basic pattern of a business transaction is composed of the following three phases:
 An actagenic phase during which a client requests a fact form the supplier agent.
 The action execution which will generate the required fact
 A factagenic phase, which leads the client to accept the results reported
Basic transactions can be composed to account for complex transactions. The DEMO methodology gives the analyst an understanding of the business processes of the organization, as well as the agents involved, but is less clear about pragmatics aspects of the transaction, such as the conversation structure and the intentions generated in each agents mind.

Jan Dietz is the founder of the DEMO, and he is also co-founder and chairman of the DEMO Knowledge Center  and he has participated in numerous practical DEMO-projects regarding the redesign and reengineering of organizations. Since early 2004 he is also the leader of the national research program Extensible Architecture Framework.

Enterprise Ontology 
Enterprise Ontology is about the need to develop organizational models on a high-level of abstraction, in order to be able to develop effective and efficient, so called, inter- and intra-enterprise information systems. These models need to be so that it is understood both by business people, who are defining their functionality, and software engineers, who are constructing and implementing the software systems that realize the system's functionality. The idea of business components for modeling information systems is very valuable since they directly reflect the business rules and the constraints that apply to the enterprise domain.

The identification of business components seems still to be in its infancy. The notion of enterprise ontology, as developed by Jan Dietz at Delft University of Technology, appears to be a powerful revelation of the essence of an enterprise or an enterprise network. Dietz' research seeks to improve the identification of business components based on the ontological model of an enterprise, while at the same time satisfying well defined quality criteria. The results of applying the developed identification method are reusable and self-contained business components with well defined interaction points that facilitate the accessing and execution of coherent packages of business functionality.

Publications 
Dietz has published over 200 scientific and professional papers as well as several books: Books:
 1996. Communication Modeling - The Language/Action Perspective: Proceedings of the First International Workshop on Communication Modeling, Tilburg, the Netherlands... (Electronic Workshops in Computing). With Frank Dignum, Egon Verharen, and Hans Weigand. Springer 
 2006. Enterprise Ontology - Theory and Methodology. Springer-Verlag Berlin Heidelberg. 
 2008. Advances in Enterprise Engineering I: 4th International Workshop CIAO! and 4th International Workshop EOMAS, held at CAiSE 2008, Montpellier, France, June 2008. Notes in Business Information Processing. With Antonia Albani, and Joseph Barjis (eds.). Springer. 
 2008. Architecture - Building strategy into design. Academic Service. 

Articles, chapters and papers, a selection:
 1989. "Modeling of Discrete Dynamic Systems - Framework and Examples". With K.M. van Hee and G.J. Houben. In: Information Systems. Vol. 14, no.4, pp 277–289.
 1991. "Speech Acts or Communicative Action?" With G.A.M. Widdershoven. In: L. Bannon (eds.) Proceedings of the Second European Conference on Computer Supported Cooperative Work ECSCW'91. Kluwer, Dordrecht, 1991, pp. 235–248.
 1992. "Subject-Oriented Modelling of Open Active Systems". In: E.D. Falkenberg (eds.). Information Systems Concepts: Improving the Understanding. IFIP Transactions A-4, North Holland, Amsterdam, 1992, pp. 227–238.
 1994. "Modelling business processes for the purpose of redesign". In: Proceedings of the IFIP TC8 Open Conference on Business Process Re-engineering: Information Systems Opportunities and Challenges. IFIP Transactions; Vol. A-54. pp. 233–242.  
 1998. "Understanding and Modelling Business Processes with DEMO". In: Proc. 18th International Conference on Conceptual Modeling (ER'99), Paris, 1999.
 1998. "Linguistically based Conceptual Modeling of Business Communication". With: A.A.G. Steuten and R.P. van de Riet. In: Proc. 4th International Conference NLDB '99, Lecture Notes in Computer Science. Vol. 129, Springer-Verlag 1999.
 2002. "Development of Agent-based E-commerce Systems using the semiotic approach and the DEMO transaction concept". With J. Barjis, S. Chong and K. Lui. In: International Journal of Information Technology & Decision Making. Vol. 1, No. 3 (September 2002),
 2006. "The pragmatic web: a manifesto". With Mareike Schoop and Aldo de Moor. In: Communications of the ACM. Vol 49, Iss 5  (May 2006). pp. 75–76.

References

External links 

 Homepage at the  Delft University of Technology.
 DEMO Design & Engineering Methodology for Organizations website.

1945 births
Living people
Dutch computer scientists
Enterprise modelling experts
Information systems researchers
Dutch software engineers
Software engineering researchers
Academic staff of the Delft University of Technology
Eindhoven University of Technology alumni
Academic staff of Maastricht University
Academic staff of the Technical University of Lisbon
People from Brunssum
20th-century Dutch engineers
21st-century Dutch engineers